Shopping is the debut novel by British author Gavin Kramer published in 1998 by Fourth Estate, it won the David Higham Prize, the Geoffrey Faber Memorial Prize, and was short-listed for the Whitbread First Novel Award.

Plot Introduction
Tall, awkward Meadowlark, an English lawyer is determined to make a success of his two-year assignment in Tokyo. He appears dull, infallible and incorruptible; immune to the temptations of the Roppongi nightlife. But then he meets Sachiko, a fashion obsessed teenager who leads him on an expensive buying spree. Eventually Sachiko meets a richer sponsor and Meadowlark falls apart.

Reception
Reviews were generally positive :
Francine Prose in The New York Times wrote, "Kramer's vision and analysis of Japanese society are neither especially profound nor revelatory, but his book is a great deal of fun"..."Kramer has a sharp ear for the hilarious conversations that take place when the participants speak just enough of the same language to make themselves hopelessly misunderstood. His energy is infectious, and at times his writing is not merely breathless but exhilarating as he conveys the experience of ricocheting through the sensory overload of Tokyo." but then warns, "The highly charged prose style of Shopping can carry you, quite contentedly, through much of the book. It's not until the last third or so, when the plot spins out of control and begins to fall apart, that the reader finally notices that the characters lack the individuality and depth required to make fiction seem driven by psychological necessity rather than by the arbitrary, dogged application of the author's will." She concludes "Gavin Kramer is talented. He can really write, and Shopping promises that—in the near future, one hopes—he will write a consistently satisfying novel.
Kirkus Reviews has a similar conclusion, "Images of Tokyo today are engagingly rendered with precision and a knowing eye, but the characters in this flashy pool all stick to the shallow end.

Publication history
1998, UK, Fourth Estate, Pub date Jun 1998, Paperback
1999, UK, Fourth Estate, Pub date Apr 1999, Hardback
1999, UK, Fourth Estate, Pub date Apr 1999, Paperback
2000, US, Soho Press, Pub date Apr 2000, Hardback
2003, US, Soho Press, Pub date Jul 2003, Paperback

External links
Chapter One online

References

1998 British novels
Novels set in Tokyo
1998 debut novels
Japan in non-Japanese culture
Fourth Estate books